PSS Maitland was a Scottish built iron paddlesteamer, used in Australia as a passenger vessel.

On the sixth of May 1898 the Maitland was wrecked at Broken Bay in a storm. On board were 32 crew including Captain Richard James Skinner and 30 passengers. One of the survivors was a baby, Daisy Hammond, who lived to the age of 90, dying in 1988. Her ashes were scattered at the wreck site. Reports suggest between 21 and 29 people were killed. The "Maitland Gale" was responsible for the wreckage of other ships. Maitland Bay was named after the shipwreck.

References

1898 in Australia
Coastal trading vessels of Australia
History of New South Wales
Individual sailing vessels
Maritime incidents in 1898
Ships built in Scotland
Shipwrecks of the Northern Sydney Region
Shipwrecks of the Central Coast Region
Paddle steamers of Australia
1870 ships